The Sarawak Parties Alliance (Malay: Gabungan Parti Sarawak; abbrev: GPS) is a Sarawak-based national political alliance in Malaysia. It was established in 2018 by four former Barisan Nasional (BN) component parties operating solely in Sarawak following the federal coalition's defeat in the 2018 Malaysian general election. It is currently the fourth largest political coalition with 23 seats in the Dewan Rakyat, and forms the government in the state of Sarawak.

History

Formation 
GPS was formed on 12 June 2018, consisting of Parti Pesaka Bumiputera Bersatu (PBB), Sarawak United Peoples' Party (SUPP), Parti Rakyat Sarawak (PRS), and Progressive Democratic Party (PDP). The four parties were former component parties in Barisan Nasional (BN) coalition, with a gentleman's agreement that Peninsular or Sabah based parties within BN would never establish themselves in Sarawak, thus giving the parties a relative autonomy. The coalition focuses on the state's interests and rights based on the Malaysia Agreement and remain an opposition at the Pakatan Harapan (PH) federal government despite the readiness to "cooperate and collaborate". On 23 August 2018, its chairman, Abang Abdul Rahman Zohari Abang Openg, announced that GPS has been registered and is awaiting the issuance of the official letter from the Registrar of Societies (RoS). The coalition was finally legalised on 19 November 2018.

Policy 
As the component parties of GPS quit BN en bloc, it inherits BN's former place and dominance in Sarawak politics. The party claimed to continue the legacy of Adenan Satem, a relatively popular former Sarawak's chief minister, who led BN Sarawak to its triumph in 2016 state election on basis of greater autonomy of Sarawak. Although the party pushed for constitutional amendments in accordance to 1963 Malaysian Agreement, its policy did not mention an outright Sarawak independence, rather it prefers to work within existing laws to regain what it calls as Sarawak's rights. The coalition launched its party policy in Kuching on 19 January 2019. It often received condemnation from opposition parties in Sarawak and foreign observers for continuing abuse of government powers, such as uneven allocation of aid and development and perceived punishment toward ethnic chiefs not aligned with the government. The party also directly or indirectly controlled most major media publications in Sarawak.

Big role played 

Following the political crisis in 2020 which saw the PH government lose its majority in the Dewan Rakyat, GPS entered into an agreement by declaring support for the new government coalition, Perikatan Nasional (PN). GPS chairman, however, maintained that the agreement will not see GPS become a member of PN, but will remain as a partner instead. A week after PN's prime ministerial pick, Muhyiddin Yassin, was sworn in as the new premier, he announced his cabinet which saw four MPs from GPS appointed full ministers, and five others as deputy ministers.

Elections 

GPS made its maiden electoral appearance in 2021 Sarawak state election. The election was marked as a huge success for the party, as it increased control over Sarawak State Legislative Assembly by winning 76 out of 82 seats contested.

Member parties

Former member parties 
 United Sarawak Party (PSB) (2018–2019)

List of party chairman

Elected representatives

Dewan Negara (Senate)

Senators 

 His Majesty's appointee:
 Paul Igai (PDP)
Robert Lau Hui Yew (SUPP)
 Rita Sarimah Patrick Insol (PRS)
 Susan Chemerai Anding (PBB)
 Sarawak State Legislative Assembly:
 Nuing Jeluing (PBB)
 Ahmad Ibrahim (PBB)

Dewan Rakyat (House of Representatives)

Members of Parliament of the 15th Malaysian Parliament 

Gabungan Parti Sarawak has 23 MPs in the House of Representatives.

Dewan Undangan Negeri (State Legislative Assembly)

Malaysian State Assembly Representatives 

Sarawak State Legislative Assembly

GPS state governments

Ministerial posts

State election results

General election results

References

External links 
 

Political party alliances in Malaysia
2018 establishments in Malaysia
Political parties established in 2018
Centre-right parties in Asia